Kalagnanam is a Telugu language book about the prediction of past, and present, future (upcoming).

The Kalagnanam has many authors, who prophesied the future of their times. Most famous among them are Sri Yogi Nareyana (Kaiwara Thatha) who was a bangle seller who became great saint with blessings of lord Amara Narayana Sawamy and wrote Kalagnana. Another saint Sri Madvirat Pothuluri Veera Brahmendra Swamy and Eswaridevi (the grand daughter of Veera Brahmendra Swamy). There are also other people who told Kalagnanam, like Yogi Subbaraya Sharma, Swami Madhavacharya (also called Vidyaranya, the minister of Harihara I) and Dudekula Siddaiah (the disciple of Veera Brahmendra Swamy).

A brief part of Kalagnanam written by Sri Veera Brahmendra Swamy, which was kept in his native place has been published in Telugu language as a book in 1970 for the first time, along with some other prophet's work. The remaining 3parts of Kalajnyaanam, A large volume of the predictions made by Veera Brahmendra Swamy are said to be kept under the Tamarind tree in Achamaamba temple or Achamaamba home in Banaganapalle village of Kurnool district of Andhra Pradesh. Out of the brief context of Kalagnanam said by Veera Brahmendra Swamy, 320 verses or poems are very popular with name "Govinda Vakyas".

Another prophet, Saint Sarvajna has prophesied since rule of King Bijjalaraya to emerge of Future Avatar, Veera Bhoga Vasanta Rayalu. His prophecies are in poetic way called 'Dwipada'.

The whole part of prophecies said by many saints from South India is included in the kalagnanam book which was published by Brahmamgarimatam. The most part of Kalagnanam alias prophecies collection, describes about the coming King-cum-Avatar, Veera Bhoga Vasanta Rayalu and his acts. About 70 percent of prophecies speak of him, while the other part describes the events to be happened mainly in South India.

References

External links
 http://www.kalagnani.com
 Telugu language version of Kalagnanam

Telugu language